Marcia Morales Howard (born July 16, 1965) is a United States district judge of the United States District Court for the Middle District of Florida.

Education and career

Howard was born in Jacksonville, Florida. She received a Bachelor of Science degree in economics from Vanderbilt University in 1987 and her Juris Doctor with honors from the Fredric G. Levin College of Law at the University of Florida in 1990. At UF Law she was elected to the Order of the Coif and served as the Symposium Editor for the Florida Law Review. Howard was in private practice in Jacksonville from 1990 to 2003 as a civil litigator concentrating in labor and employment law, and was a member of the National Association of Railroad Trial Counsel. From 2003 to 2007, she served as a United States magistrate judge in the Middle District of Florida.

Federal judicial service

On January 9, 2007 she was nominated by President George W. Bush to serve as a judge on the United States District Court for the Middle District of Florida. Her nomination was confirmed by the United States Senate on February 15, 2007. She received her commission on February 20, 2007.

See also
List of Hispanic/Latino American jurists

References

External links

Profile on the United States District Court for the Middle District of Florida website

1965 births
Living people
Vanderbilt University alumni
Fredric G. Levin College of Law alumni
Hispanic and Latino American judges
Judges of the United States District Court for the Middle District of Florida
United States district court judges appointed by George W. Bush
21st-century American judges
People from Jacksonville, Florida
United States magistrate judges
21st-century American women judges